Charles Gorman may refer to:

Charles Gorman (actor) (1865–1928), American actor
Charles Gorman (speed skater) (1897–1940), Canadian speed skater
Buddy Gorman (Charles J. Gorman, 1921–2010), American actor

See also
Charlie Gorman (disambiguation)